Steven MacLean (born 23 August 1982) is a Scottish former professional footballer who played as a forward. He coaches at St Johnstone.

MacLean has previously played for Rangers, Scunthorpe United, Sheffield Wednesday, Cardiff City, Plymouth Argyle, Aberdeen, Oxford United, Yeovil Town, Cheltenham Town, St Johnstone and Raith Rovers. He also represented the Scotland national under-21 football team.

Club career

Early career
MacLean began his senior football career at Rangers, followed by a loan spell at Third Division outfit Scunthorpe United, scoring 25 goals. Despite this, Rangers manager Alex McLeish deemed that he was not "a first team prospect" and placed him on the transfer list.

Sheffield Wednesday
On 7 July 2004, MacLean joined Football League One club Sheffield Wednesday for an undisclosed fee, believed to be around £125,000, and signed a three-year deal.

He scored 20 goals in his first season, including a hat-trick against fellow South Yorkshire side Doncaster Rovers, Wednesday's first away hat-trick for 32 years. He was the first Sheffield Wednesday player to hit the 20 goal mark in one season since Mark Bright in 1994. He also scored a crucial penalty under pressure in the play-off final to level the scores at 2-2. Wednesday went on to defeat their opponents Hartlepool United 4-2 after extra time.

MacLean sustained a broken leg on the eve of the club's Championship campaign in August 2005, but returned in the latter part of the season to score two penalties for Wednesday, first at home to rival club Sheffield United in a 2–1 defeat and then against league champions Reading, which earned the Owls a 1–1 draw.

MacLean sustained another injury setback in August 2006 after scoring in a 1–1 draw against Burnley, but made a comeback a month later in the defeat to Derby County. He finished the 2006–07 season with 13 goals from 22 first team starts and 22 substitute appearances, making him the club's joint top goal scorer for the season with Deon Burton and showing signs of returning to the form in which he played with in the 2004–05 season.

Cardiff City
On 22 June 2007, it was announced that MacLean had signed for Sheffield Wednesday's Championship rivals Cardiff City, after failing to agree a new contract at Hillsborough. The move was a surprise to many Owls fans as MacLean was rumoured to have declared his willingness and desire to remain at the club. Speculation arose during the prolonged contract-talks with Wednesday that MacLean was demanding a significant pay-rise from that of his previous contract. It is possible that another stumbling block which prevented Sheffield Wednesday renewing MacLean's contract, was a clause in his contract which would grant former club Rangers £50,000 if he re-signed.

MacLean began the season as Cardiff's leading striker after Robbie Fowler was deemed not fit enough to play in some of the team's opening games. Famous for having never missed a penalty in his career, he came to Cardiff to miss one on his debut, leaving his new club to lose 1–0 to Stoke City in the first game of the season. He scored his first goal for the Bluebirds in the next game away to Queens Park Rangers, as Cardiff won 2–0. However, with Fowler soon returning and the arrival of Jimmy Floyd Hasselbaink, MacLean found himself relegated to the bench. Things continued to get worse for him as he suffered ruptured ankle ligaments in a reserve match against Plymouth Argyle, which was expected to rule him out until December. However, he made an early return coming on as a substitute in a 1–0 loss to Southampton on 21 October 2007. After his return, he made mostly late substitute appearances, with just three starts for Cardiff – in a 2–0 defeat against Charlton Athletic, a 2–2 draw with Watford, and a 3–1 win against Chasetown in the FA Cup.

Plymouth Argyle
After finding himself out of favour at Cardiff, MacLean signed a three and a half-year deal with Plymouth Argyle on 18 January 2008, reuniting with former Sheffield Wednesday manager Paul Sturrock. The fee of £500,000 was a record signing for Argyle. He made his debut for the club the next day in a 1–1 draw against Southampton and scored his first goal for the club on 12 February in the sixth minute against Barnsley in a 3–0 win at Home Park. MacLean failed to gel into the team and an attitude problem combined with a lack of goals angered the fans. In October 2009 Maclean was informed by Plymouth manager Sturrock that he was free to look for a new club. On 28 December, MacLean joined Scottish Premier League side Heart of Midlothian on trial. He swiftly left again as Vladimir Romanov refused to finance a move.

Aberdeen (loan)
After a month of speculation, MacLean finally signed for Aberdeen on loan until the end of the 2009–10 season on 1 February 2010. He scored his first goal for Aberdeen in a 2–2 draw with Hibernian on 10 February 2010 and scored a brace in his next match, a 4–4 draw with Celtic at Pittodrie on 13 February 2010, bringing his tally to three goals in three league games for the Dons. By the time his loan at Aberdeen had finished, MacLean had made 16 appearances and scored 5 goals.

Oxford United (loan)
On 11 November 2010, MacLean signed for Oxford United on loan. He scored his first goal for Oxford in a 2–1 win against league leaders at the time Chesterfield on 23 November. On 19 January 2011, MacLean signed an extension to his current loan deal to play for 'The U's' for the rest of the season. After finished his spell at Oxford United, MacLean made 31 appearances and scoring 6 goals.

Yeovil Town
Released by Plymouth at the end of the season, MacLean sought out other clubs and went on trial with Yeovil Town in July 2011. On 26 July 2011, MacLean officially joined Yeovil Town on a one-year deal. On Town's first match for the 2011–12 season, MacLean made his Yeovil debut in a 2–0 loss against Brentford. Also, on his debut, MacLean received a yellow card in the third minute. On 9 September 2011, MacLean and scored his first goals for Yeovil in a 4–3 loss against Preston. He also scored in a cup tie with AFC Bournemouth, also setting up Max Ehmer later in the game. His next goal was in a 3–2 defeat away to Bury, but his celebration was said to be a gesture towards new manager Gary Johnson. The incident was subject to an internal enquiry by the club and could have led to MacLean's contract being terminated, but two days late Johnson said that he was satisfied the gesture was just an "over-exuberant" celebration.

Cheltenham Town (loan)
After Yeovil's game against Carlisle United, Johnson explained that he had received an approach from Robins manager Mark Yates, and with MacLean struggling to get minutes on the pitch at present, the Glovers boss told BBC Somerset that he could see it as suiting all parties. On 22 March 2012, it was confirmed that MacLean had completed a loan move to Cheltenham Town until the end of the season. He scored his first and only goal for Cheltenham in a 2–1 win at former club Plymouth Argyle on 5 May 2012.

St Johnstone
MacLean signed a short-term contract with SPL club St Johnstone on 1 September 2012, making his debut as a late substitute in a 2–1 win over Celtic on 15 September. He scored his first goals for the club with a brace against Queen's Park in the Scottish League Cup on 25 September. Four days later, MacLean scored his first league goal in a 3–1 win over Dundee. However, he suffered a dislocated elbow during the match and was out of action for about six weeks He marked his recovery from injury, in a 1–1 draw against Inverness Caledonian Thistle on 27 October. The following month, MacLean signed a contract extension, keeping him at the club until the end of 2014. MacLean ended a run of seven games without scoring in a 2–2 draw against Hearts on 15 December 2012. Later in the season, MacLean was a regular in the first team, though his goalscoring form dropped, as he was used in more of a supporting role.

In the 2013–14 season, MacLean was included for four matches in the Europa League match and in the first leg of their Europa League third qualifying round tie, he scored his first European goal, in a 1–0 win over Belarus side Minsk. However, the next leg, Minsk equalised, leading to extra time and then to penalty shoot-out. MacLean's penalty was saved, eliminating St Johnstone from the Europa League. After the match, MacLean quoted "I tried to go for power [with my penalty] but the keeper has guessed right" In the newly founded Scottish Premiership at the top of the Scottish Professional Football League, MacLean scored four goals between late September and mid-October against Partick Thistle, Inverness Caledonian Thistle and St Mirren. Unfortunately, MacLean had an operation on his knee after an injury sustained against St Mirren and was expected to be out for three months.

After four months out, MacLean made his return for the club, scoring twice in a 3–0 win over Motherwell on 25 February 2014. He remained in the first team for the remainder of the season and signed a contract extension to keep him for the next two years. Weeks after signing a new deal, MacLean started in the Scottish Cup Final, alongside his striking partner, Stevie May. With ten minutes remaining and St Johnstone winning 1–0, MacLean scored the second goal in the final after "he slid in to challenge Cierzniak before turning the ball over the line while grounded." In his celebrations, MacLean removed his shirt, resulting a yellow card. After the match, MacLean spoke that the scoring the goal was an incredible feeling and had no regrets of removing his shirt, insisting it was worth it.

On 24 July 2014, MacLean made amends for his missed penalty in the Europa League a year earlier by emphatically scoring the first penalty in the Europa League 2nd Round Qualifier against FC Luzern at McDiarmid Park, after the match finished 1–1, 2–2 on aggregate, with MacLean scoring for the Saints in the first leg a week earlier in Switzerland. MacLean scored his first league goal of the season, in the opening game of the season, in a 2–1 win over Ross County. Weeks later on 23 August 2014, MacLean scored his second goal of the season, in a 1–0 win over Aberdeen. However, MacLean suffered a knee injury after an operation, which kept him out for four months. After making his return to training, MacLean made his return to the first team, in a 2–1 win over Dundee United on 27 December 2014. In Dave Mackay's absence, MacLean was captain for the match against Aberdeen, a 1–1 draw on 23 January 2015. Unable to recuperate scoring goals throughout the season, MacLean, nevertheless, helped the club qualify for the Europa League for 2015–16: the third year running.

MacLean scored a hat-trick in his final appearance for St Johnstone, a 5–1 win against Motherwell on 5 May 2018.

Heart of Midlothian
MacLean signed a pre-contract agreement with Hearts in April 2018. He joined the Edinburgh club on a two-year contract during the 2018 close season. MacLean scored on his debut for Hearts on 18 July 2018 in a 2–1 victory at Cove Rangers in the Scottish League Cup. He played in the 2019 Scottish Cup Final, a 2–1 defeat at the hands of Celtic.

Coaching career

St Johnstone
MacLean retired at the end of 2019–20 season to become a first-team coach for St Johnstone.

International career
Although never capped by the senior team, MacLean represented Scotland at various age levels.

Career statistics

Honours
Rangers
 Scottish Cup: 2002–03

Sheffield Wednesday
 EFL League One play-offs: 2005

St Johnstone
 Scottish Cup: 2013–14

References

External links

1982 births
Living people
Footballers from Edinburgh
Scottish footballers
Scotland under-21 international footballers
Association football forwards
Scottish Premier League players
English Football League players
Rangers F.C. players
Scunthorpe United F.C. players
Sheffield Wednesday F.C. players
Cardiff City F.C. players
Plymouth Argyle F.C. players
Aberdeen F.C. players
Oxford United F.C. players
Yeovil Town F.C. players
Cheltenham Town F.C. players
Forres Mechanics F.C. players
St Johnstone F.C. players
Heart of Midlothian F.C. players
Raith Rovers F.C. players
Scottish Professional Football League players